Laura Scaravonati (born 1978) is an Italian mountain bike orienteering competitor. At the 2011 World MTB Orienteering Championships in Vicenza, she won a bronze medal in the long course, behind Rikke Kornvig from Denmark and Ingrid Stengård from Finland.

References

External links

Italian orienteers
Female orienteers
Italian female cyclists
Mountain bike orienteers
Living people
1978 births
Place of birth missing (living people)
Cyclists from the Province of Cremona